GOR Ciracas Stadium is a multi-purpose stadium  in the city of East Jakarta, Indonesia. The stadium has a capacity of 5,000 people.

It is the former home base of Villa 2000 After changed its name to Celebest FC in 2016 and moved to its current stadium in Gawalise Stadium in the same year.

Tournament

References

east Jakarta
Sports venues in Indonesia
Football venues in Indonesia